Colin Jackson is a Welsh sprinter and sports broadcaster.

Colin Jackson may also refer to:
Colin Jackson (politician) (1921–1981), British Labour politician, MP for Brighouse & Spenborough in 1974
Colin Jackson (Scottish footballer) (1946–2015), Scottish footballer
Colin Jackson (Australian footballer) (born 1906), Australian footballer for Melbourne